Margaret Molloy is an Irish businesswoman. Based in New York City, she is the chief marketing officer and head of new development at Siegel+Gale, a strategy and design firm. Molloy is a member of Global Irish Network, an advisory group to the Government of Ireland. Formerly the Board Chairperson for the New York Hub of The Marketing Society, a global community of over 3,000 senior marketers, Molloy is now a board member. In addition to her duties as a board member of The Marketing Society, she serves on the board of directors of ANA Business Marketing NYC and on the board of the Origin Theater. In 2020, she was a founding member of Chief, a private network built to drive more women into positions of power and keep them there. Furthermore, she serves as a member of The WIE Suite, a private membership community of women leaders and creatives, as well as a member of the Wall Street Journal CMO Network.

Molloy has been published in Harvard Business Review, Fast Company. She is a frequent contributor to LinkedIn and Forbes. Molloy is also the creator of #WearingIrish, a platform which promotes awareness of Irish fashion design.

Early life and education

The eldest of six, Molloy grew up on a dairy farm in Tubber, County Offaly, Ireland. In 1993, she earned a Bachelor of Arts degree in business and Spanish from the Ulster University, Northern Ireland, and La Universidad de Valladolid, Spain. She moved to the United States in 1994, and, in 2000, earned a Master of Business Administration from Harvard Business School. Margaret currently resides in Manhattan with her husband, economist Jim O'Sullivan, and their two sons, Finn and Emmet O’Sullivan.

Career 

Molloy's first role was with Irish state agency Enterprise Ireland. She then went to Harvard Business School to complete her MBA. Afterwards, she worked in various marketing and management positions including SVP of Marketing at professional network Gerson Lehrman Group and leading teams at Siebel Systems (Oracle) where she was a member of the CEO's Circle. In 2013, she was appointed Chief Marketing Officer and head of business development at Siegel+Gale. Under her leadership, the agency's marketing team was shortlisted for the Campaign U.S. 2023 Agency of the Year award. 

Margaret drives breakthrough marketing that grows company profile, profit, and team pride. A strategic marketer with a tech DNA, she has a 20-year track record as a business-to-business growth instigator, achieved by uniting brand building with demand generation. Her career spans enterprise tech, professional and financial services, and agencies, and is unified by a focus on sales and marketing alignment. A builder of high-performance teams, she believes the CMO must set a clear vision for business performance and that execution is the ultimate differentiator.

Publications & Podcasts 
In addition to Harvard Business Review, Fast Company, and Forbes, Molloy has been featured in such esteemed publications as AdAge, Adweek, The Drum, MediaPost, ClickZ, and Authority Magazine. Molloy is a frequent podcast guest, including appearances on Masters of Service, Marketing Masters, Brilliance Beyond Borders, and Legends of Sales and Marketing.

Future of Branding 
Molloy is a highly influential CMO and convener of panels and roundtables. She hosts the pioneering and award-winning "Future of Branding" roundtable series. Every one-hour roundtable consists of five CMOs discussing thought-provoking topics ranging in theme from collaborating across the C-suite to building resilience to cultivating creativity. The conversations are reproduced on the "How CMOs Commit" podcast, of which Molloy is the host.

#WearingIrish 

In early 2016, Molloy launched #WearingIrish to promote Irish fashion by inviting friends to wear garments or accessories by Irish designers during the month of March, and to post their photos on social media using the hashtag #WearingIrish. The platform exposes Ireland's talented fashion designers to new markets, showcasing the originality and skill of Irish design on the global stage. Molloy states, "as a marketer, I am fascinated by the possibilities that social media provides for ordinary citizens to show their support for brands and causes. Connecting all three interests — fashion, marketing, and Irish heritage — I saw an opportunity for people to come together on social media to support Irish designers." In 2019, Molloy and #WearingIrish were featured in a Nationwide special on RTÉ One, Ireland's most watched TV channel.

Some of the brands selected to participate in Wearing Irish: Aine, Triona, Dubarry, Helen Steele.

Awards and honors

Molloy received the 2017 B2B Marketer of the Year award (The Drum). In April 2019, along with leading names in the advertising and marketing industry, Margaret was profiled on How I Got Here: 7 Ad Industry Origin Stories. Other accolades include Image Magazine's "Overseas Irish Business Woman of the Year (2017), IrishCentral's 2018 Creativity and Arts Award in Fashion and Design, Top 50 Power Women, and Top 100 Irish Americans in Business. She was recognized by Forbes as one of the top 10 CMOs on Twitter (@MargaretMolloy). Molloy was also listed by Richtopia as one of the Top 100 Chief Marketing Officers internationally. In November 2019, she was honored by the Douglas Hyde Foundation. The next year, in 2020, her peers voted her the 2020 Top 100 Marketer OnCon Icon Award. That same year, she was named a Marketing Society Fellow. In 2022, she was recognized as a Top 20 Most Important Women in Marketing 2022, as well as LinkedIn Top 15 Voices in Marketing & Advertising. For her contributions to the technology sector, she was included in the "Silicon Valley 50" award.

References

External links 

Wearing Irish

Living people
1970 births
Chief marketing officers
Marketing women
Irish women in business
Irish marketing people
21st-century Irish businesspeople
Alumni of Ulster University
Harvard Business School alumni